Freaky Ali is a 2016 Indian Hindi-language sports comedy drama film, written, produced and directed by Sohail Khan, with Raaj Shaandilya serving as a co-writer. The film stars Nawazuddin Siddiqui, Arbaaz Khan, and Amy Jackson in the lead roles.

Based on the 1996 American comedy film, Happy Gilmore, Freaky Ali was released on 9 September 2016.

Plot
Ali, an orphaned poor Muslim man, gets fired from a clothing store after he insults a kid who turns out to be the owner's son. He worries that he won't be able to earn money anymore to take care of his Hindu mother, Sulbha but his friend Maqsood motivates him. They approach a rich and royal woman, Padmavati, for money, but manage to do it only after a fight with her. Maqsood, it is shown, works for a gangster, Danger Bhai.

Ali is all set to be married but the alliance is broken when the clothing store owner recognizes him and turns out to be a close relative of the bride's family. Dejected, Ali visits a golf course to get some money from a businessman named Singhania. Unaware of what he is up to, Ali pokes fun at Singhania, who challenges him to hit an ace. Ali accepts his challenge and wins it, returning home after collecting the money. Ali's uncle, Kishan Lal, who is a caddy driver for Singhania, tells Ali that if he plays golf he can get rich and become a champion. Motivated by this, he begins training under Kishan's tutelage.

Ali contests for a golf tournament, and in the process, falls for royal champion Vikram Rathore's manager Megha, who praises his performance, while Vikram chides him. Ali pays the entry fee and qualifies for the top 60 players. Vikram soon fires Megha and shows his arrogance to Ali, but he retaliates, telling him that golf could be a game for the poor too. He begins winning a number of matches and earns enough money to take care of Sulbha; Megha grows close to him and Sulbha in the process.

Danger Bhai, upon the behest of his elder brother, Bade Bhai, tricks and blackmails Maqsood to hijack Ali's success, and a misled Maqsood cunningly substitutes himself for Kishan, misguiding Ali into losing matches. When Megha finds this out, Maqsood's cover is blown and Ali walks away in anger after slapping him. He tries to explain why was he doing this, but Sulbha lectures Maqsood on the importance of honesty. Maqsood regrets and decides to help Ali. Vikram injures Ali's hand on the pretext of congratulating him for getting to the finals; everyone feels worried and starts praying. Ali comes back to the final event with an injured hand which is recovering currently. Bade Bhai joins Danger Bhai, who in turn joins Vikram.

Maqsood tells Vikram that he may have broken Ali's hand, but he can't break his courage, and Maqsood becomes the new caddy. Ali gets inspired by his mother, who hits back at Danger Bhai and Bade Bhai for trying to insult her son. Ali then during the match gains his confidence back, removes plaster-bandage and plays perfectly. When Maqsood asks Ali what he's going to do, Ali tells that he's going to "hit a six like in cricket". Ali executes a great shot flying above the tree and into the hole and Ali wins. Vikram accepts his defeat and lets him go. Bade Bhai praises Ali and declares that he will end all his illegal businesses, and Ali celebrates his victory with his friends and Megha.

Cast
 Nawazuddin Siddiqui as Freaky Ali
 Arbaaz Khan as Maqsood
 Amy Jackson as Megha
 Jas Arora as Vikram Rathore
 Fazal Saeed
 Seema Biswas as Sulbha
 Nikitin Dheer as Danger Bhai
 Asif Basra as Kishan Lal
 Jackie Shroff as Bade Bhai (cameo appearance)
 Karishma Kotak as Aditi
 Paresh Ganatra as Danger Bhai's assistant 
 Alam Khan
 Ankit Nagar (golfer) as Ankit Nagar

Soundtrack

Box office

India
The film opened with a collection of 2.55 crores in India. By the end of its first weekend, the film brought in 8.50 crore nett in India. In next four days the film collected 5 crore and took its first week collection to a total of 13.50 crore nett. The total nett collection of film in India is 14.67 crore while its grossing over there is 15.0 crore.

Overseas

References

External links

2010s Hindi-language films
2016 films
2010s sports comedy films
Indian sports comedy films
Golf films
2016 comedy films